Shangqiu Normal University (SQNU), formerly known as Shangqiu Teachers' College, is a public university in the city of Shangqiu, in Henan Province, China. As a key university in Henan Province, it is a comprehensive local university with salient features of teacher training and a particular strength in liberal arts. The main undertakings are undergraduate education with the chief aim of producing high-level application-oriented talents.

The institution has a student population of about 17,000.

Campuses
SQNU is divided into two campuses: the Old Campus, and the New Campus.

The Old Campus is about 100 years old and houses the technical and science related majors: mathematics, computer science, etc. The New Campus, which is finishing construction, lies less than 1  km away; it houses the university's liberal arts: English, History, Music, etc.

Over the next few years, SQNU plans to acquire land from a military training center on its western boundary, further increasing its size and eventually classifying it as a full-fledged University.

System
SQNU is a state-run full-time university, offering bachelor's programmes (four years). The students are conferred with graduate diploma of Shangqiu Normal University and bachelor's degree after they have completed the four-year curriculum and passed the necessary courses.

Majors
There is a wide range of over 50 majors.

References

External links

Universities and colleges in Henan
Teachers colleges in China